Nisha Ganatra (born June 25, 1974) is a Canadian-American film director, screenwriter, producer, and actress of Indian descent. She wrote, directed, and produced the independent comedy drama Chutney Popcorn (1999) and later directed the independent film Cosmopolitan (2003) and the romantic-comedy Cake (2005). Ganatra has directed for numerous television shows, including The Real World, Transparent, You Me Her, Better Things, and Brooklyn Nine-Nine. She also directed the comedy-dramas Late Night (2019) and The High Note (2020). Ganatra served as a consulting producer on the first season of Transparent, for which she was nominated for the 2015 Primetime Emmy Awards for Outstanding Comedy Series.

Early life and education 
Ganatra explored her interest in film through acting and then decided to make the switch to pursue film-making as she wanted to effect cultural change.

Ganatra began her film-making journey by studying at The University of California, Los Angeles (UCLA). Though she wasn't studying film, she explored her interest by sneaking into screenwriting classes which eventually led her to creating short films.

She moved to New York City to pursue a film degree at New York University Film School (NYU). During her time there, she created a short film Junky Punky Girlz (1997) which won NYU's Tisch Fellowship and most outstanding short film from PBS. Ganatra graduated from the New York University (NYU) Tisch School of the Arts.

Career 
While in film school, Ganatra directed several episodes of MTV's long-running television series The Real World in 2001. Prior to this she had written and directed two shorts and her critically acclaimed independent film Chutney Popcorn (1999).

Ganatra is part of a mentorship program with NBC which seeks to provide talented female directors with the same opportunities as their male counterparts. This program selects female directors to be given the opportunity to shadow up to three episodes of an NBC series. The participants will then be able to direct at least one episode of the series in which she has been shadowing.

When Ganatra was on the hunt for a cinematographer, she began to notice that the men's reels were far superior compared to the women's reels. As a female director herself, she was accustomed to being overlooked in the hiring process in favor of men. She realized that the men had better reels not because they were more talented, but instead, because they had been given bigger budgets, better equipment, larger crews, and elaborate productions. This motivated Ganatra to hire a female cinematographer and strive to hire female crews. In 2020, it was reported that ABC had put into development a single-camera matchmaking comedy written, directed, and produced by Ganatra.

Personal life
Ganatra is out and identifies as a lesbian.

Filmography

Film

TV series

Director
 The Real World: Back to New York (2001) (4 episodes)
 The Real World/Road Rules: Battle of the Seasons (2002) (1 episode)
 Futurestates (2011) (1 episode)
 Haven (2012) (1 episode)
 Big Time Rush (2012) (1 episode) 
 Transparent (2014) (3 episodes)
 The Mindy Project (2015) (1 episode) 
 Mr. Robot (2015) (1 episode)
 Married (2015) (3 episodes)
 Red Oaks (2015) (2 episodes) 
 Shameless (2016) (1 episode)
 Brooklyn Nine-Nine (2016) (1 episode) 
 You Me Her (2016) (10 episodes)
 Better Things (2016) (3 episodes)
 Girls (2017) (1 episode)
 Dear White People (2017) (2 episodes)
 Fresh Off The Boat (2017) (1 episode)
 Future Man (2017)
 Love (2018)
 Black Monday (2019) (1 episode)
 And Just Like That... (2022)

Screenwriter
 Futurestates (2011) (TV series, 1 episode)

Producer
 Margaret Cho: Beautiful (2009), field producer
 Cho Dependent (2011), field producer
 Transparent (2014) (TV series, 10 episodes), consulting producer
 You Me Her (2016) (TV series, 10 episodes), co-executive producer
 Better Things (2016) (TV series, 9 episodes), co-executive producer

See also
 List of female film and television directors
 List of lesbian filmmakers
 List of LGBT-related films directed by women

References

External links
Official site 

1974 births
Living people
Canadian film actresses
Canadian television actresses
Canadian television directors
Canadian women film directors
Canadian lesbian actresses
LGBT film directors
Canadian women television directors
Canadian actresses of Indian descent
Actresses from Vancouver
Film directors from Vancouver
LGBT television directors
Asian-Canadian filmmakers
20th-century Canadian screenwriters
20th-century Canadian women writers
21st-century Canadian screenwriters
21st-century Canadian women writers
Canadian women screenwriters
21st-century Canadian LGBT people
20th-century Canadian LGBT people
Canadian lesbian artists